Rod Laver and John Newcombe won in the final 7–6, 6–2 against Malcolm Anderson and Ken Rosewall.

Draw

Draw

External links
1973 Australian Indoor Championships Doubles Draw

Doubles